In artificial neural networks, the activation function of a node defines the output of that node given an input or set of inputs. 
A standard integrated circuit can be seen as a digital network of activation functions that can be "ON" (1) or "OFF" (0), depending on input. This is similar to the linear perceptron in neural networks. However, only nonlinear activation functions allow such networks to compute nontrivial problems using only a small number of nodes, and such activation functions are called nonlinearities.

Classification of activation functions 
The most common activation functions can be divided in three categories: ridge functions, radial functions and fold functions.

An activation function  is saturating if . It is nonsaturating if it is not saturating. Non-saturating activation functions, such as ReLU, may be better than saturating activation functions, as they don't suffer from vanishing gradient.

Ridge activation functions 

Ridge functions are multivariate functions acting on a linear combination of the input variables. Often used examples include:

 Linear activation: ,
 ReLU activation: ,
 Heaviside activation: ,
 Logistic activation: .

In biologically inspired neural networks, the activation function is usually an abstraction representing the rate of action potential firing in the cell. In its simplest form, this function is binary—that is, either the neuron is firing or not. The function looks like , where  is the Heaviside step function.

A line of positive slope may be used to reflect the increase in firing rate that occurs as input current increases. Such a function would be of the form .

Neurons also cannot fire faster than a certain rate, motivating sigmoid activation functions whose range is a finite interval.

Radial activation functions 

A special class of activation functions known as radial basis functions (RBFs) are used in RBF networks, which are extremely efficient as universal function approximators. These activation functions can take many forms, but they are usually found as one of the following functions:
 Gaussian: 
 Multiquadratics: 
 Inverse multiquadratics: 
 Polyharmonic splines

Folding activation functions 

Folding activation functions are extensively used in the pooling layers in convolutional neural networks, and in output layers of multiclass classification networks. These activations perform aggregation over the inputs, such as taking the mean, minimum or maximum. In multiclass classification the softmax activation is often used.

Comparison of activation functions
There are numerous activation functions. Hinton et al.'s seminal 2012 paper on automatic speech recognition uses a logistic sigmoid activation function. The seminal 2012 AlexNet computer vision architecture uses the ReLU activation function, as did the seminal 2015 computer vision architecture ResNet. The seminal 2018 language processing model BERT uses a smooth version of the ReLU, the GELU.

Aside from their empirical performance, activation functions also have different mathematical properties:

 Nonlinear When the activation function is non-linear, then a two-layer neural network can be proven to be a universal function approximator. This is known as the Universal Approximation Theorem. The identity activation function does not satisfy this property. When multiple layers use the identity activation function, the entire network is equivalent to a single-layer model.
 Range When the range of the activation function is finite, gradient-based training methods tend to be more stable, because pattern presentations significantly affect only limited weights. When the range is infinite, training is generally more efficient because pattern presentations significantly affect most of the weights. In the latter case, smaller learning rates are typically necessary.
 Continuously differentiable This property is desirable (ReLU is not continuously differentiable and has some issues with gradient-based optimization, but it is still possible) for enabling gradient-based optimization methods. The binary step activation function is not differentiable at 0, and it differentiates to 0 for all other values, so gradient-based methods can make no progress with it.

These properties do not decisively influence performance, nor are they the only mathematical properties that may be useful. For instance, the strictly positive range of the softplus makes it suitable for predicting variances in variational autoencoders.

Table of activation functions 
The following table compares the properties of several activation functions that are functions of one fold  from the previous layer or layers:

The following table lists activation functions that are not functions of a single fold  from the previous layer or layers:

 Here,  is the Kronecker delta.
 For instance,  could be iterating through the number of kernels of the previous neural network layer while  iterates through the number of kernels of the current layer.

See also
 Logistic function
 Rectifier (neural networks)
 Stability (learning theory)
 Softmax function

References

Artificial neural networks